Syracuse (satellite based radiocommunication system) is a series of French military communications satellites.

Syracuse is intended to ensure the French military can communicate between mainland France and military units deployed around the world. The satellite participates in command, reassignment and logistic aspects of operations. The system is nominally under the command of the French Navy, equipping a total of 54 ships (2009) and it is complemented by the Telcomarsat commercial system of communications.

Syracuse 1 to 3 
Syracuse 1 and 2 were payloads on joint civilian-military satellite designs developed and operated by the French PTT, and were more commonly known by their civilian names Télécom 1 (3 satellites in 1984, 1985 and 1988) and Télécom 2 (4 satellites in 1991, 1992, 1995 and 1996). Matra Marconi Space was a development contractor, who also worked on the British Skynet 4 military communications satellite.

In 2006, the programme was awaiting for the third phase, Syracuse-3, to replace Syracuse-2. Syracuse-3 is composed of two satellites developed by the Direction générale de l'armement (DGA), and a third satellite (Sicral-2), developed along with Italy. It is an attempt of the French armed forces to achieve autonomy in terms of satellite communications.

Satellites comprising the constellation:
 Syracuse-3A (launched 13 October 2005)
 Syracuse-3B (launched 11 August 2006)
 SICRAL-2 (launched 26 April 2015)

Syracuse 4 
In 2018, the French Ministry of Defence announced the development of three Syracuse-4 satellites. Two satellites, Syracuse 4A and 4B, were initially ordered, with a third one, Syracuse 4C, that has been added later. Surplus capacity will be sold to armed and security forces in Europe and elsewhere. Airbus Defence and Space will supply and operate the satellite ground stations.

It was announced in July 2019 that the next generation of Syracuse satellites, Syracuse-4, would have cameras to identify possible attackers. The satellites of the following generations (Syracuse-5) will be equipped with defensive weapons. Florence Parly, Minister of the Armed Forces, officially signed on 3 September 2019 the decree creating the Space Command (Commandement de l'espace - CDE) within the Air Force, which should eventually become the "Air and Space Army".

The first satellite of this family, Syracuse 4A, was launched on 24 October 2021 with an Ariane 5 ECA rocket from the Guiana Space Centre. The second one, Syracuse 4B, is scheduled to be launched in June 2023, while the third one is scheduled to be launched by 2025.

See also 

 French space program
 CNES
 Defense Satellite Communications System
 Skynet (satellite)

References 

Communications satellites
Military communications
Communications satellites in geostationary orbit
Satellites of France
Communications satellites of France